The Cross Gates–Wetherby line is a former railway line in West Yorkshire, England, between Cross gates, near Leeds, and Wetherby. The line opened 1876 and closed 1964.

History and description
Construction began in 1871, with the work contracted to Thomas Nelson of Carlisle.

The line ran from Cross Gates East Junction east of Cross Gates railway station on the Leeds and Selby Railway,  to Wetherby (Linton Road) railway station, then connecting at  a junction (later East junction) on the Harrogate to Church Fenton Line at west of Wetherby (York Road) railway station.

The  from Cross Gates to Wetherby took four years to construct and it was opened on 1 May 1876.  The line was doubled in 1901 and a new south-west curve was built at Wetherby; running from West junction to North junction, forming a wye junction north and west of both the Wetherby stations.

The line closed to passengers on 6 January 1964.

Stations
Penda's Way
Scholes
Thorner
Bardsey
Collingham Bridge
Wetherby

References

External links

Closed railway lines in Yorkshire and the Humber
North Eastern Railway (UK)
Railway lines opened in 1876
Railway lines closed in 1966